There was one newspaper in Antigua and Barbuda at the beginning of 2020, The Daily Observer.  It was founded in 1993.  Initial publication was by fax.  It was a daily newspaper, publishing Monday through Saturday. As of 2018, it is available only online.  It is owned by NewsCo Limited, which is located on the 4th Floor of ABI Financial Building, 156 Redcliffe Street, St. John's, Antigua. AntiguaNewsRoom.com is a news website.

Historic newspapers

 The Antigua Free Press, published by Benjamin Mekom (Benjamin Franklin's nephew)
 The Weekly Register, founded in 1814 by Henry Loving, ceased in 1839
 Herald Gazette, founded in 1831
 Antigua Almanac and Register, founded in 1843
 Antigua Observer, founded in 1843
 Antigua Times, founded in 1851 by an American, Fred S. Jewett, ceased in 1878
 Antigua Standard, founded in 1874, changed to Antigua Sun in 1909, ceased in 1922
 The Magnet, founded in 1931
 The Progress, founded in 1940
 The Antigua Star, founded in 1940
 The Worker's Voice, founded in 1944 by the Antigua Trades and Labour Union, ceased in the 1990s
 The Anvil, founded in 1956
 The Antigua Times, founded in the late 1960s
 Antigua Yearbook, founded in 1964
 The Outlet, founded in 1968, associated with the Antigua Caribbean Liberation Movement, ceased in the 1990s
 The Trumpet, founded in about 1968
 The Sentinel, late 1980s/1990s, founded by Vere Bird Jr.
 News Pages Antigua, founded in the 2000s
 Carib Arena, founded in the 2000s, short-lived
 Antigua Sun and Sun Weekend, founded in 1997 by Allen Stanford
 Caribbean Times, in Antigua and Barbuda, ceased to publish in January 2018. (There is a newspaper also called Caribbean Times that is published in New York City.)

References

 
 
 

Antigua and Barbuda
Newspapers published in Antigua and Barbuda